Justice Bacon may refer to:

Nathaniel Bacon (Michigan jurist) (1802–1869), associate justice of the Michigan Supreme Court
William J. Bacon (1803–1889), ex officio a judge of the New York Court of Appeals